The Kent State Golden Flashes men's basketball team represents Kent State University in Kent, Ohio, United States. The Golden Flashes compete in National Collegiate Athletic Association (NCAA) at the Division I level as a member of the Mid-American Conference (MAC) East Division. The team was founded in 1913 and played their first intercollegiate game in January 1915. They joined the Mid-American Conference in 1951 and have played in the East division since the MAC went to the divisional format in 1997. Home games are held at the Memorial Athletic and Convocation Center, which opened in 1950 and is one of the oldest arenas in college basketball. Rob Senderoff was hired as head coach in 2011, the 24th coach in the program's history.

The Flashes gained national attention in the late 1990s and early 2000s after earning their first bid to the NCAA Division I men's basketball tournament in 1999. Two years later, Kent State picked up their first tournament win, followed the next year by their run to the Elite Eight in  2002 as a 10th seed where the Flashes finished the season ranked 12th nationally. The 2002 Golden Flashes also set a team record with 30 wins along with a MAC single-season record of 17 conference wins. Through the 2022–23 season, Kent State has seven total appearances in the NCAA tournament, the most recent being in 2023, along with eight appearances in the National Invitation Tournament (NIT), and six in the CollegeInsider.com Tournament (CIT) and its successor The Basketball Classic (TBC).  In MAC play, the Flashes have six regular-season titles, nine East division titles, and seven MAC tournament championships.

History
The men's basketball team is Kent State's oldest collegiate team, founded in 1913 during the first fall semester at the new Kent State Normal School campus. The team was organized, though only five men were enrolled out of the initial enrollment of 140 at the beginning of the term, as the new school was a teacher training college and thus had a predominately female student body. More men would arrive at the school in the coming weeks. They played and won their first game against Kent High School and competed against local company and high school teams for that first season, going 7–2. During the following season, Kent State played its first intercollegiate game, a 56–6 loss to Otterbein College, on January 22, 1915. An additional intercollegiate game, a 54–18 home loss to Muskingum College, was played that year along with three other games against local teams. Kent State's first intercollegiate win was recorded March 10, 1916, a 27–17 home win over Ashland College, played in the former heating plant and manual training building. A shortage of men during both World Wars prevented teams from being formed for the 1917–18, 1918–19, and 1943–44 seasons. Beginning in 1932, Kent State played as a member of the Ohio Athletic Conference before joining the Mid-American Conference and beginning league play in 1951. Kent State was placed in the East Division when the MAC went to a divisional alignment in 1997.

During their first years of existence, a variety of different venues were used for home games including on-campus facilities at what is now Cartwright Hall and the old heating plant, as well as off-campus facilities at the local Congregational Church gymnasium and Theodore Roosevelt High School, until Wills Gymnasium opened in 1925.  In 1950, the team moved to their current home, the Memorial Athletic and Convocation Center, known originally as the Men's Physical Education Building until 1956 and later as Memorial Gym until 1992.

The team played in relative anonymity for most of its existence.  They made their first appearance in the MAC tournament championship game (which began in 1980) in 1984, losing a close 42–40 game.  They would make the title game again in 1987 and 1989, losing both 64–63 and 67–65 respectively.  The Flashes made their first post-season appearance in the 1985 National Invitation Tournament, losing in the first round.  They returned to the NIT in 1989 and 1990, losing in the first round both times.

Beginnings of success
In 1996, Gary Waters was hired as head coach and began to build what would become the longest run of success in Mid-American Conference history.  In 1999 the Flashes won over 20 games and defeated the Miami RedHawks in the MAC tournament championship game in Toledo to win their first MAC tournament title and make their first-ever NCAA tournament appearance, where they were defeated by Temple in the opening round at FleetCenter in Boston.  The following season, the Flashes again won over 20 games and finished second in the MAC East, but failed to win the conference tournament and received their first NIT invitation since 1990.  The Flashes hosted the first-round game against Rutgers and recorded their first-ever post-season win, a 73–62 victory.  Kent State would win their second-round match-up at Villanova before falling in the quarterfinals at Penn State.  The 2000–2001 season saw the Flashes win their first-ever MAC East title and their second tournament title to return to the NCAA tournament.  The experience in the NIT proved to be valuable as Kent State scored their first win, a 77–73  upset over the fourth-seeded Indiana Hoosiers, before falling to the Cincinnati Bearcats in the second round in San Diego.  At the end of the 2000–01 season, Waters accepted the head coaching job at Rutgers.  While at KSU, Waters overall record was 92–60.  He was succeeded at Kent State by Stan Heath.

2001–02 season

Kent State enjoyed its best season in 2001–02, led by seniors Trevor Huffman, Andrew Mitchell, Demetric Shaw, and Eric Thomas and junior transfer Antonio Gates.  The season saw MAC records set in overall wins (30), conference wins (17), and longest winning streak (21).  After beginning the season 4–4, Kent State won 20 of their next 21 games.  Following their only MAC loss of the season (a 66–65 loss at Buffalo), they proceeded to win 15 straight games to close the regular season at 24–5 with a 17–1 record in the MAC and winning their first-ever MAC regular season title.  After winning the 2002 MAC men's basketball tournament, the Flashes qualified for the 2002 NCAA Division I men's basketball tournament and were seeded tenth in the South regional bracket.  After scoring a mild upset of the seventh-seeded Oklahoma State Cowboys, the Flashes gained national attention by defeating second-seeded SEC champion Alabama 71–58 to advance to the Sweet Sixteen.  The Flashes followed that win with a 78–73 overtime win over third-seeded Pitt to become the first MAC team to advance to the Elite Eight since Ohio in 1964, when the tournament contained only 22 teams. The Flashes 21-game winning streak and season came to an end in the Elite Eight with an 81–69 loss to Indiana. The Flashes finished the season at 30–6 and were ranked 12th in the final ESPN/USA Today Coaches poll released after the tournament.  Following the season, Stan Heath accepted the head coaching job at the University of Arkansas, leaving after just one season and a record of 30–6.  Assistant coach Jim Christian was hired later that year as the next head coach.

Jim Christian

The Flashes continued their success under Jim Christian, winning over 20 games every season he was coach along with MAC East titles in 2003, 2004, 2006, and 2008; MAC overall titles in 2006 and 2008; and winning the MAC tournament again in 2006 and 2008.  In both 2003 and 2004, Kent State lost in the MAC tournament championship game and received bids to the NIT.  Following their 2006 MAC tournament title, they advanced to the 2006 NCAA Division I men's basketball tournament as a 12th seed where they lost in the opening round.  In 2004, Kent State broke the MAC record for consecutive seasons with 20 or more wins by posting their sixth consecutive season.  The streak is currently at ten as the 2007–2008 team won their 20th game on February 12, 2008 at Central Michigan University.  In addition, Kent State broke the record for consecutive seasons with ten or more conference wins in a season by posting their ninth consecutive season of ten or more conference wins in 2006–2007, breaking the previous record of eight.  The 2007–2008 season has seen several firsts and milestones for the program.  On February 19, 2008, the Flashes recorded their 1,000th win in program history, a 76–66 win over the Buffalo Bulls at Buffalo's Alumni Arena.  On February 24, the Flashes scored their first-ever win against a ranked team in the regular season, defeating the Saint Mary's Gaels 65–57 in Moraga, California.  This was followed by Kent State's first-ever regular season ranking, rising to 23rd in the Associated Press poll and 24th in the ESPN/USA Today Coaches Poll.  With their 61–58 win at Akron on March 9 to close out the regular season, Kent State set a program record for wins in the regular season with 25, breaking the previous record of 24 set in the 2001–2002 season. Following their fifth conference tournament title, Kent State earned the highest seed in school history, a ninth seed in the Midwestern region of the 2008 NCAA tournament, where they fell to the UNLV Runnin' Rebels in the opening round.  On March 29 Jim Christian resigned to take the head coaching job at Texas Christian University.  He finished with a career record of 138–58 at Kent State.  Christian was replaced by his top assistant coach Geno Ford, who officially took over the program on April 2.

Geno Ford
Geno Ford took over the program in 2008 and led the team to three winning seasons, including two regular season MAC Championships in the 2009–10 and 2010–11 seasons. It was the first time a team had won successive MAC regular season championships since Miami in 1991 and 1992 and the first time a team had won two consecutive outright titles since Ball State in 1989 and 1990. In 2011, KSU appeared in their 11th MAC tournament championship game, but fell in overtime. Although the team failed to advance to the NCAA tournament during Ford's tenure, they did have three consecutive post-season appearances including the 2009 CollegeInsider.com Tournament and the 2010 and 2011 NITs. Kent State advanced to the second round of the 2010 NIT, winning their first post-season game since the 2002 Elite Eight run, and advanced to the quarterfinals of the 2011 NIT with two road wins. Ford left the team to take the head coaching job at Bradley University on March 27, 2011.  Ford finished with a 68–37 record at Kent State.

Rob Senderoff
Rob Senderoff, succeeded Ford as head coach on April 7, 2011 after briefly serving as interim head coach after Ford's departure. Senderoff had worked as an assistant at Kent State with Ford under Jim Christian from 2002–06 before joining the staff of Kelvin Sampson at Indiana as an assistant. Following the Kelvin Sampson recruiting controversy, Senderoff was issued a three-year show-cause penalty by the NCAA and forced to resign at Indiana. He was rehired at Kent State in 2008 as associate head coach. In his first two seasons as head coach, the Flashes continued some of their recent success, winning 20 games in each season and advancing to the CollegeInsider.com Postseason Tournament in 2012. The 2012–13 season was Kent State's first season not winning at least 10 MAC games since the 1997–98 season, though the team did advance to the 2013 CollegeInsider.com Postseason Tournament where they finished 1–1. The 2013–14 team struggled to a 16–16 record and 7–11 record in MAC play, the team's worst season since a 13–17 overall record in 1997–98 and worst MAC record since a 7–11 mark in 1996–97.

Jimmy Hall played for the team in 2014-17, and his career 8.69 rebounds per game were 7th-highest in the MAC. Hall was the only Kent player to ever finish his career with 1,600 points and 800 rebounds, and his 1,683 career points are third-most in Kent history. His 672 field goals are the most in school history, and his 867 rebounds are second in school history.

During Senderoff's tenure, the Flashes became the first Division I program in any team sport to sign a recruit diagnosed with autism to a National Letter of Intent. Kalin Bennett, a center from Little Rock, Arkansas, was signed in November 2018 and arrived on campus in August 2019, making his debut in the last minutes of the Flashes' 2019–20 season opener.

MAC season results

Overall conference titles shaded in ██ gold. East division titles shaded in ██ light yellow.
* – Overall record includes tournament and postseason results; Regular-season conference record contained in parentheses. 
** – The MAC tournament was first held in 1980.  From 2000–20, it included all conference members.

MAC tournament
Kent State has appeared in all but three Mid-American Conference tournaments since the tournament began in 1980 and through 2022 has an overall record of 46–33 in tournament play. Through 2023, the Flashes have appeared in 14 MAC title games, winning seven. The seven tournament championships are tied for most in conference history with Ohio and Ball State. The 14 title game appearances are the most in conference history.

Postseason

NCAA tournament
The Golden Flashes have appeared in seven NCAA tournaments. Their combined record is 4–7.

NIT
Kent State has appeared in nine National Invitation Tournaments.  Their combined record is 5–9.

CollegeInsider.com Tournament and The Basketball Classic
Kent State appeared in the CollegeInsider.com Tournament five times with a record of 3–5. They have made one appearance in The Basketball Classic, the successor to the CollegeInsider.com Tournament, and have a record of 0–1.

Awards

All-Americans

Retired numbers

Rivalries

The series dates back to February 19, 1916, when the two teams played in Kent in the basement of the old heating plant, won by Akron 37–16. Kent State recorded their first win in the series, a 23–21 win at Wills Gymnasium, in 1927. Through the 2022–23 season, the Flashes lead the series 83–81. Akron's longest winning streak in the series is a nine-game streak from 1942 to 1949, while Kent State's longest winning streak is five games, which has occurred three times. Kent State had a 19-game home winning streak against the Zips, which spanned from 1964 to 1998. Despite the length of the rivalry and close proximity of the campuses, the series has only been a conference meeting since 1992 when Akron joined the Mid-American Conference. Prior to 1992, the rivalry was played in the Ohio Athletic Conference (OAC) for two periods, the first from 1932, when Kent State joined the conference, until 1936, when Akron left the OAC. The second period of conference play began in 1944 after Akron returned to the OAC, and ended when Kent State left the conference in 1951 to join the MAC. When the MAC created East and West divisions in 1998, both teams were placed in the East division. Since 2011, the games count as part of the larger Wagon Wheel Challenge between the two schools.

Since the start of MAC divisional play late 1990s, the two programs have met regularly with MAC East and overall championships on the line. Through the 2022–23 season, the Flashes and Zips have combined for 16 MAC East titles, 10 MAC regular-season championships, and 11 MAC tournament championships. The teams have often had their second meeting of the season as the regular season's final game, with several of those games featured in national broadcasts. Akron won the East division with a 66–64 overtime win at the MAC Center to end the regular season and claimed the MAC regular-season title in 2012 with a 61–55 win in Kent. The second meeting in 2010, played at James A. Rhodes Arena and broadcast nationally on ESPN, featured both teams atop the conference standings at 12–3. Kent State won the game 74–61 to clinch the MAC regular-season title. The following season, the Flashes clinched their second-consecutive MAC title with a 79–68 win over the Zips at the MAC Center in a nationally televised game on the regular season's final day, repeating the feat in 2015 with a 79–77 win over the Zips on ESPN2 to claim the regular-season and East division co-championship.

In the MAC tournament, the Zips and Flashes have met 10 times through the 2023 tournament, including four times in the championship game. Akron holds a 6–4 edge in all tournament games, with Kent State picking up wins in 1998, 2008, 2017, and 2023, and Akron defeating the Flashes in 2007, 2011, 2012, 2013, 2015 and 2022. In the MAC championship game, played in Cleveland at the venue now known as Rocket Mortgage FieldHouse, the teams have split the four meetings. Kent State defeated the Zips 74–55 in the 2008 MAC Championship game, the Zips claimed the 2011 MAC tournament championship over Kent State with a 66–65 overtime win, Kent State won the 2017 MAC tournament championship over Akron, 70–65, and the Zips claimed the 2022 MAC men's basketball tournament title over Kent State, 75–55.

Kent State also has local rivalries with the Cleveland State Vikings from Cleveland State University and the Youngstown State Penguins from Youngstown State University, both members of the Horizon League and located in Northeast Ohio near Kent. The series with Cleveland State began in 1933 when Cleveland State was Fenn College, though was discontinued after 1945. It resumed in 1971 and has been held regularly since then. Kent State leads the Vikings 32–23 following an 67–58 win in Cleveland early in the 2022–23 season. The series with Youngstown State began in 1929 and lasted through 1960. It resumed in 1998 and has been held regularly since then. The Flashes lead the series 31–16 following a 111–78 Kent State win at Rhodes Arena in Akron to open the 2017–18 season, the Flashes' ninth straight win in the series. Kent State, Cleveland State, Youngstown State, and Akron signed a four-year agreement in 2014 to create the Northeast Ohio Coaches vs. Cancer doubleheader, a season opening event featuring the region's Division I basketball programs that rotates to each of the four schools.  Kent State hosted the inaugural doubleheader in 2015, followed by Youngstown State in 2016 at the Beeghly Center, Akron in 2017 at James A. Rhodes Arena, and Cleveland State  in 2018 at the Wolstein Center.

References

External links